Absolute Classic Rock is a semi-national digital radio station owned and operated by Bauer as part of the Absolute Radio Network. Its music output is non-stop classic rock hits.

Formerly known as Virgin Radio Classic Rock, it originally was an internet-only radio station, and launched in 2000 under the name Virgin Classic by Lee Roberts, SMG Radio Director. On DAB Digital Radio in London, the station launched at 12:15pm with Richard Skinner introducing Steppenwolf's "Born to Be Wild". The launch time, presenter, and song (though not the artist) were identical to its parent station Virgin Radio.

On 1 September 2008 it was announced that Virgin Radio Classic Rock would be rebranded as Absolute Classic Rock on 29 September 2008.

The station was removed from Freesat channel 725 on 8 December 2011 because of "economic realities".

DAB expansion
On 10 December 2010 Absolute Classic Rock expanded on DAB from London, taking over from Global Radio owned Gold on DAB in the North of England where there were 10 million potential new listeners on DAB in Newcastle, Sunderland, Darlington, Middlesbrough, Leeds, Hull, Scunthorpe, Grimsby, York, Huddersfield, Doncaster, Harrogate, Bradford, Sheffield, Blackburn, Preston, Blackpool, Bolton, Lancaster, Liverpool, Chester, Wrexham (North Wales) and Warrington

On 20 December 2010 Absolute Classic Rock launched on DAB to a potential new 3 million new listeners in Ayr, Bath, Cardiff, Coventry and Exeter.

In 2011 it was confirmed by Ofcom that to accommodate the launch of new sister station Absolute Radio 60s, the reduction of the broadcast bitrate of Absolute Classic Rock would be permitted on the various multiplexes on which it broadcasts.

West Midlands changes
On 7 January 2019, Bauer closed Free Radio 80s and replaced it with Greatest Hits Radio West Midlands. It launched the station on its 105.2 FM frequency which covers Birmingham and the Black Country and Bauer chose to allocate its AM frequencies which cover that area to Absolute Classic Rock. This was the first time that the station had been available on analogue radio.  Transmissions on 990 and 1017 kHz ceased on 30 April 2020, with service remaining on 1152 kHz until 30 June 2020, when that was also ceased.

Notable former presenters
Former presenters include Richard Skinner, Tommy Vance, Alan Freeman, and Alice Cooper.

References

External links

Absolute Classic Rock's page on Last.fm, showing a listing of tracks played

See also
Bauer Media Group

Absolute Radio
Bauer Radio
Classic rock radio stations in the United Kingdom
Rock radio stations in the United Kingdom
Internet radio stations in the United Kingdom
Radio stations established in 2000
2000 establishments in the United Kingdom